In constructive mathematics, Church's thesis  is an axiom stating that all total functions are computable functions.

The similarly named Church–Turing thesis states that every effectively calculable function is a computable function, thus collapsing the former notion into the latter. The fully formalizable constructivist principle  is stronger in the sense that with it every function is computable.
Then, for a family of existence claims  proven not to be validated for all  in a computable manner discussed below, the contrapositive of the axiom implies that this is then not validated by a total function  at all. In this way, adopting  collapses the scope of the notion of function, restricting it to the defined notion of computable function. The axiom in turn affects ones proof calculus, negating some common classical propositions.

The axiom is clearly incompatible with systems that validate total functional associations which are also proven not to be computable. For example, Peano arithmetic  is such a system. However,  is equiconsistent with both  as well as with the theory given by  plus . That is, adding either the law of the excluded middle or Church's thesis does not make Heyting arithmetic inconsistent, but adding both does.

Formal statement
This principle has formalizations in various mathematical frameworks. 

For each formula  of two variables, the schema includes the axiom

This axiom states that a functional assignment, i.e. a family of valid existence claims , can then always be asserted in a computable manner: If for every x there is a y satisfying φ then there is in fact an e that is the Gödel number of a general recursive function that will, for every x, produce such a y satisfying the formula, with some u being a Gödel number encoding a verifiable computation bearing witness to the fact that y is in fact the value of that function at x.

Relatedly, implications of this form may instead also be established as constructive meta-theoretical properties of theories. A theory is then said to be closed under the rule.

The above is also called the arithmetical form of the principle, since only quantifier over numbers appear in its formulation. In higher-order systems that can quantify over functions directly, a form of  can be stated as a single axiom saying that every function, from the natural numbers to the natural numbers, is computable.

This postulates that all functions  are computable, in the Kleene sense, with an index e. Thus, so are all values .

For example, in set theory functions are elements of function spaces and total functional by definition. A total function has a unique return value for every input in its domain. Being sets, set theory has quantifiers that range over functions.

Relationship to classical logic
As an example, the Halting problem provenly not computably decidable, but assuming classical logic it is a tautology that every Turing machine either halts or does not halt on a given input. Further assuming Church's thesis one in turn concludes that this is computable - a contradiction. Assuming the classical tautology above, this relation can be proven total, i.e. it constitutes a function that returns 1 if the machine halts and 0 if it does not halt. Thus  and  disproves some consequence of the law of the excluded middle. Principles like the double negation shift (commutativity of universal quantification with a double negation) are also rejected by the principle.

For example, the classical weak second-order arithmetic  is consistent with this single axiom, because  has a model in which every function is computable. However, the single-axiom form becomes inconsistent with excluded middle in any system that has axioms sufficient to prove existence of functions such as the function h. E.g., adoption of variants of countable choice in an arithmetic theory, such as

where  denotes a sequence, spoil this consistency.

Constructively formulated subtheories of  can typically be shown to be closed under a Church's rule and the corresponding principle is thus compatible. But as an implication it cannot be proven by such theories, as that would render the stronger, classical theory inconsistent.

Extended Church's thesis
Extended Church's thesis  extends the claim to functions which are totally defined over a certain type of domain. 
This may be achieved by allowing to narrowing the scope of the universal quantifier and so can be formally stated by the schema:

In the above,  is restricted to be almost-negative.
When considering the domain of all numbers (e.g. when taking  to be the trivial ), the above reduces to the previous form of Church's thesis.

The extended Church's thesis is used by the school of constructive mathematics founded by Andrey Markov Jr.

Realizers and meta-logic
This above thesis can be characterized as saying that a sentence is true iff it is computably realisable. 
This is captured by the following meta-theoretic equivalences:

and

Here,  stands for "" and "" denotes the metatheoretical equivalence.

The second equivalence can be extended with Markov's principle  as follows:

The existential quantifier has to be outside  in this case, because  is non-constructive and lacks the existence property.

See also
 Computable function
 Disjunction and existence properties
 Realizability

References

Elliott Mendelson (1990) "Second Thoughts About Church's Thesis and Mathematical Proofs", Journal of Philosophy 87(5): 225–233.

Constructivism (mathematics)